Haridaspur is a village and gram panchayat in Nalhati I CD Block, in Rampurhat subdivision of Birbhum district, West Bengal, India.

Geography

Location
Brahmani River and Baidhara Barrage are located nearby.

Nalhati, the CD Block headquarters, is 8 km away from Haridaspur and Rampurhat, the nearest town, is 18 km away.

Gram panchayat
Villages in Haridaspur gram panchayat are: Bhabanandapur, Bhagabatipur, Gunua, Haridaspur, Jungul, Kartickdanga, Lakshminarayanpur, Madhabpur, Santoshpur and Shingdohari.

Demographics
As per the 2011 Census of India, Haridaspur had a total population of 2,856 of which 1,469 (51%) were males and 1,387 (49%) were females. Population below 6 years was 357. The total number of literates in Haridaspur was 1,746 (69.87% of the population over 6 years).

References

Villages in Birbhum district